West Baptist Church (Bible Church of God; Old School ; Hardshell Baptist Church) is a historic church building at 500 W. Mulberry Street in Lebanon, Ohio.

The Greek Revival building was constructed in 1860 and added to the National Register of Historic Places in 1984.

References

Baptist churches in Ohio
Churches on the National Register of Historic Places in Ohio
Greek Revival church buildings in Ohio
Churches completed in 1860
Buildings and structures in Warren County, Ohio
National Register of Historic Places in Warren County, Ohio